George McCarthy may refer to:

 George A. McCarthy, Chief Secretary of the Cayman Islands
 George E. McCarthy (born 1946), professor of sociology at Kenyon College

See also
 Thomas St George McCarthy
 George McCarty